The 2020  PBA Tour season, the 61st season of play for the U.S. Professional Bowlers Association's ten-pin bowling tour, began on January 14, 2020 with the PBA Hall of Fame Classic in Arlington, Texas, and concluded with the final round of the PBA Tour Playoffs on October 12 in Centreville, Virginia.

2020 is the first full PBA season under the new ownership of Bowlero Corporation, the world's largest operator of bowling centers. Bowlero's acquisition of the PBA was announced in September 2019.

All PBA Tour events were suspended in mid-March due to the COVID-19 pandemic. A limited return to competition began on June 6. Due to cancellations of the USBC Masters, the PBA Summer Swing and all international events, the 2020 PBA season had only 14 title events (13 singles events and one doubles event) versus 29 title events in 2019.

Media rights
All announced 2020 PBA Tour events (through June) are broadcast on Fox Sports channels, with a commitment for 24 first-run broadcasts on FS1 and five broadcasts on Fox network affiliates. Prize funds for the events on the Fox Sports calendar have increased $400,000 over 2019, with two major championships (PBA Tournament of Champions and PBA World Championship) offering a $100,000 top prize in the new season. The PBA World Championship winner's share was later increased to $150,000.

CBS Sports Network covered the PBA Tour Finals in July, as it has since the tournament's inception in 2017.

Season overview
In 2020, all five majors were scheduled to be contested within the first three months of the Fox schedule. While the PBA Tournament of Champions and PBA Players Championship majors continued to be held in February, they were now followed in late February by the U.S. Open, which moved to the winter schedule for the first time since 2012. These three majors plus the Go Bowling! PBA Indianapolis Open on Feb. 29 and PBA World Championship on March 15 all offered a $1 million bonus for any player who rolls a 300 game in the championship match.

The PBA's World Series of Bowling XI (which includes three standard PBA title events and the PBA World Championship — the season's fourth major) was scheduled to take place March 6–18 in Las Vegas, while the season's fifth and final major, the USBC Masters, was scheduled to take place March 23–29 in Reno, Nevada. The PBA World Championship concluded March 15, but the match play and final rounds of the animal pattern tournaments were postponed due to the COVID-19 pandemic. In addition, the USBC Masters, PBA Tour Playoffs, and PBA League were also postponed. On July 15, the USBC announced that the 2020 USBC Masters would be cancelled.

On May 20, the PBA announced that it would resume competition beginning in June with several non-title, made-for-TV special events, including the PBA Strike Derby (June 6), PBA Summer Clash (June 13), and PBA King of the Lanes (July 20–22). These events were held at Bowlero Jupiter in Jupiter, Florida with no fans in attendance. Regularly scheduled PBA Tour events, such as the remainder of the World Series of Bowling, the PBA League and PBA Tour Playoffs, were rescheduled for the fall.

The PBA announced on June 11 that the PBA Tour Finals, which features the top eight Tour points leaders over the last two seasons in an elimination-style tournament, would be held July 18–19 in Jupiter, Florida, despite the fact that top points earner Jason Belmonte of Australia could not attend due to COVID-19 travel restrictions. The #9 player in points, Norm Duke, took Belmonte's place. This was the first title event to be held since the COVID-19 pandemic halt. CBS Sports Network aired all rounds of the tournament (nine hours) in live broadcasts over the two days.

The PBA League held its draft on May 17, and announced that the League has expanded to ten teams (up from eight in previous seasons). On June 23, following the cancellation of the 2020 PWBA Tour season, the PBA further announced that two all-women's teams will be added to the PBA League, bringing the team total to 12. The draft for the two women's teams (10 players total) was held July 7 from a pool of the top 35 PWBA players in 2019 season points. The day after the women's draft, the PBA announced that the PBA League would take place September 26–28 in Portland, Maine. On August 20, it was announced that the PBA League was changing its location for 2020 to Centreville, Virginia and will be held without fans in attendance. The PBA further announced that television coverage on FS1 would be expanded to 12 hours over four days. Following the seeding rounds on September 26, the quarterfinals, semifinals and finals were all broadcast live September 27–30 on FS1.

On September 25, the PBA announced that the PBA League will be immediately followed by the match play rounds and TV finals for the World Series of Bowling animal pattern tournaments (postponed from March and relocated to Centreville, VA), with the final rounds airing October 4 and 5. Finally, the PBA Tour Playoffs were rescheduled for an October 10 start, with air dates spread out between October 10 and November 8. Further, the PBA announced Guaranteed Rate mortgage as the official sponsor of all Fall 2020 events.

Season highlights
 Jason Belmonte won the U.S. Open in February, upping his career majors record to 12. The win made Belmonte the PBA's seventh player to earn the career Triple Crown (U.S. Open, PBA World Championship and Tournament of Champions). He also joins Norm Duke and Mike Aulby as the only players to add the USBC Masters for a career "grand slam" and, with Aulby, one of only two bowlers to add the PBA Players Championship for a career "super slam".

 Belmonte also won the PBA World Championship on March 15, earning the highest first-place prize of the season ($150,000). This gives Belmonte another major, upping his career record to 13. The PBA World Championship was the only World Series of Bowling XI event to be completed on schedule due to the COVID-19 pandemic shut-down. The remainder of the World Series was completed in October.

 Jesper Svensson won two titles on the year – both in Indianapolis – giving him 10 career PBA Tour titles and making him title-eligible for the PBA Hall of Fame. Kyle Troup, Svensson's doubles partner in his Roth-Holman PBA Doubles Championship win, won three titles on the season, including the fourth annual PBA Tour Finals in July.

 Bill O'Neill won two titles: the PBA Players Championship in February (his second career major) and the second annual PBA Tour Playoffs in October, where he outlasted 23 other bowlers to earn the $100,000 first prize.

 Kris Prather won his third title, first major and second career $100,000 prize check in the Tournament of Champions, topping O'Neill in the February 9 final.

 The Portland Lumberjacks earned a sweep of the two PBA League events on September 26–30. The Lumberjacks won their second consecutive team title behind back-to-back League MVP winner Wes Malott.  Malott then won the special PBA League All-Star Clash, which featured one representative from each PBA League team, earning a prize check for himself as well as his teammates.

 The 2020 season saw three televised 300 games (the 27th, 28th, and 29th in PBA history), by Tommy Jones, Jakob Butturff, and François Lavoie, respectively. Lavoie had previously bowled the 26th televised 300 en route to winning the 2016 U.S. Open, and now joins Sean Rash as the only players in history to bowl 300 games in two televised PBA Tour title events. Jones became just the third player in history to bowl his televised 300 in the title match. Kyle Troup nearly joined this group, bowling a televised 299 game.

Season awards
 Chris Schenkel PBA Player of the Year: Jason Belmonte
 Steve Nagy PBA Sportsmanship Award: Brad Miller
 Tony Reyes PBA Community Service Award: Danny Wiseman

Note: The Harry Golden PBA Rookie of the Year Award was not given this season because of the abbreviated schedule.

Tournament summary
The 2020 PBA tournament schedule is shown below. Major tournaments are in bold. Career PBA title numbers for winners are shown in parenthesis (#). Winner's share prize money is shown in US dollars.

Tour points are awarded for most events. Besides the season-ending Harry Smith PBA Points Winner award, points are one consideration for Player of the Year voting, and also affect eligibility for the PBA Playoffs, PBA Tour Finals (combined with 2019 points), and the 2021 DHC PBA Japan Invitational. Points for tournaments are awarded differently based on a "tier" system. The tier of each qualifying tournament is shown in the Notes column on the tournament schedule, and is explained below.

 Tier 3: PBA short format or limited field tournaments (2500 points for first, and descending thereafter)
 Tier 2: PBA standard tournaments with a fully open field (double the points of Tier 3 events)
 Tier 1: PBA major tournaments (triple the points of Tier 3 events)

+ Tommy Jones won an additional $10,000 for rolling a 300 game in the title match.

References

External links
PBA 2020 Season Schedule

Professional Bowlers Association seasons
2020 in bowling